Indian law is enforced by a number of agencies. Unlike many federal nations, the constitution of India delegates the maintenance of law and order primarily to the states and territories.

At the federal level, some of India's paramilitary forces are part of the Ministry of Home Affairs and support the states. Larger cities have police forces under their respective state police. All senior officers in the state police forces and federal agencies are members of the Indian Police Service (IPS).

Central agencies

The central agencies are controlled by the central government. Most federal law-enforcement agencies are under the Ministry of Home Affairs. The head of each agency is an IPS officer. The constitution assigns responsibility for maintaining law and order to the states and territories, and almost all routine policing—including the apprehension of criminals—is done by state-level police forces. The constitution also permits the central government to participate in police operations and organization by authorizing the creation of the Indian Police Service.

Central police forces can assist a state's police force if requested by a state government. During the 1975–77 Emergency, the constitution was amended on 1 February 1976 to permit the central government to deploy its armed police forces without state permission. The amendment was unpopular, and use of the central police forces was controversial. After the Emergency was lifted, the constitution was again amended in December 1978 to restore the status quo.

Ministry of Home Affairs
The principal national ministry concerned with law enforcement is the Ministry of Home Affairs (MHA), which supervises a large number of government functions and agencies operated and administered by the central government. The ministry is concerned with matters pertaining to the maintenance of public peace and order, the staffing and administration of the public services, delineation of internal boundaries, and the administration of union territories.

In addition to controlling the IPS, the Ministry of Home Affairs maintains several agencies and organizations dealing with police and security. Police in the union territories are under the MHA. The Minister of Home Affairs is the cabinet minister responsible for the ministry; the Home Secretary, an Indian Administrative Service (IAS) officer, is the ministry's administrative head.

Central Armed Police Forces

Border Security Force
The Border Security Force (BSF) is responsible for policing India's land borders in peacetime and preventing trans-border crimes. A central police force under the Ministry of Home Affairs, its duties include VIP security, election supervision, guarding vital installations and counter-naxal operations.

The Indo-Pakistani War of 1965, which highlighted the inadequacy of the existing border-management system, led to the formation of the Border Security Force as a unified central armed police force mandated with guarding India's boundary with Pakistan. The BSF's policing capability was used in the Indo-Pakistani War of 1971, against the Pakistani Armed Forces, in areas which were the least threatened. During wartime or when ordered by the central government, the BSF is commanded by the Indian Army; BSF troops participated in the 1971 Battle of Longewala in this capacity. After the 1971 war (which led to the creation of Bangladesh), responsibility for policing the border with Bangladesh was assigned to the force.

Originally charged with guarding India's external borders, the BSF has been tasked with counter-insurgency and counter-terrorism operations. When insurgency in Jammu and Kashmir broke out in 1989 and the Jammu and Kashmir state police and the thinly-deployed Central Reserve Police Force (CRPF) needed extra force to cope with spiraling violence, the central government deployed the BSF to Jammu and Kashmir to combat Kashmiri militants.

BSF operates a Tear-Smoke Unit at its academy in Gwalior, Madhya Pradesh, which supplies tear gas and smoke shells for riot prevention to all state police forces. It operates dog squads, and runs the National Dog Training and Research Centre. The BSF, one of several Indian police forces which have its own air and water wings, provides helicopter, dog and other support services to the state police.

Central Industrial Security Force
The Central Industrial Security Force's (CISF) primary task is to provide industrial security. It guards industrial installations nationwide which are owned by the central government, secures seaports and airports, and provides security for certain non-governmental organizations. The CISF provides security for nuclear-power plants, space installations, mints, oil fields and refineries, heavy-engineering and steel plants, barrages, fertilizer units, hydroelectric and thermal power stations, and other installations partially (or wholly) run by the government.

Central Reserve Police Force
The Central Reserve Police Force's (CRPF) main objective is to assist states and union territories' law-enforcement agencies in maintaining law and order and containing insurgency. It is deployed as an anti-terrorist unit in several regions, and operates abroad as part of United Nations peacekeeping missions.

Indo-Tibetan Border Police
The 90,000-member Indo-Tibetan Border Police (ITBP) is responsible for security along the  Indo-Tibetan border and its surrounding areas. ITBP personnel are trained in maintaining law and order, military tactics, jungle warfare, counter-insurgency, and internal security.
They were also deployed to Indian diplomatic missions located in Afghanistan.

National Security Guard
The National Security Guard (NSG) is a commando unit originally created for counter-terrorism and hostage-rescue missions. Founded in 1986, it is popularly known as the "Black Cats" for its uniform. Like most military and elite-security units in India, it avoids the media and the Indian public is largely unaware of its capabilities and operational details.

The NSG draws its core members from the Indian Army, and the balance is support staff from other central police units. An NSG team and a transport aircraft is stationed at Indira Gandhi International Airport in New Delhi, ready to deploy in 30 minutes.

Sashastra Seema Bal
Sashastra Seema Bal (SSB), founded in 1963, is deployed at the Indo-Nepal and Indo-Bhutan borders. SSB, with over 82,000 personnel, is trained in maintaining law and order, military tactics, jungle warfare, counter-insurgency, and internal security. Its personnel are also deployed to the Intelligence Bureau (IB), Research and Analysis Wing (R&AW), Special Protection Group (SPG), National Security Guard. Officers begin as an assistant commandant (equivalent to deputy superintendent of police on a state force), and retire with the rank of inspector general (IG).

Special Protection Group
The Special Protection Group (SPG), the central government's executive protection agency, is responsible for the protection of the Prime Minister of India and their immediate family. The force was established in 1985, after the assassination of Indira Gandhi. It provides daily, round-the-clock security throughout India to the present Prime Minister and his family.

Central investigation and intelligence institutions

Central Bureau of Investigation
The Central Bureau of Investigation (CBI) is India's premier investigative agency, responsible for a wide variety of criminal and national security matters. Often cited as established with the Delhi Special Police Establishment Act, 1946, it was formed by the central government (which controls the Delhi police) with a resolution. Its constitutionality was questioned in the Gauhati High Court Narendra Kumar vs Union of India case on the basis that all areas of policing are exclusive to state governments, and the CBI is a central-government agency. The court ruled that despite the lack of legislation, the CBI is an authorized agency of the central government for national policing. Its ruling was upheld by the Supreme Court of India, which cited the CBI's national importance.

The bureau is controlled by the Department of Personnel and Training in the Ministry of Personnel, Public Grievances and Pensions of the government of India, usually headed by the Prime Minister as the Minister of Personnel, Public Grievances and Pensions. India's Interpol unit, the CBI draws its personnel from IPS officers throughout the country. Specializing in crimes involving high-ranking government officials and politicians, the CBI has also accepted other criminal cases because of media and public pressure (usually due to local-police investigative incompetence).

Income Tax Department

The Income Tax Department (ITD) is India's premier financial agency, responsible for a wide variety of financial and fiscal matters. The department is controlled by the Department of Revenue in the Ministry of Finance, headed by a minister who reports directly to the prime minister. The Central Board of Direct Taxes (CBDT) is also part of the Department of Revenue. It provides input for policy and planning of direct taxes, and is responsible for the administration of direct-tax laws through the Income Tax Department. The CBDT operates in accordance with the Central Board of Revenue Act, 1963. The board members, in their ex officio capacity, are also a division of the ministry dealing with matters relating to the levy and collection of taxes, tax evasion and revenue intelligence. It is India's official Financial Action Task Force on Money Laundering (FATF) unit. The Income Tax Department draws its staff from Indian Revenue Service officers nationwide, and is responsible for the investigation of economic crimes and tax evasion. Some special agents and agents can carry firearms.

The Directorate of Criminal Investigation (DCI) is headed by the Director General of Intelligence (Income Tax), which was created to address cross-border black money. The DCI conducts unobtrusive investigations of "persons and transactions suspected to be involved in criminal activities having cross-border, inter-state or international ramifications, that pose a threat to national security and are punishable under the direct tax laws."

Commissioners of the ITD's intelligence directorate posted in cities such as Delhi, Chandigarh, Jaipur, Ahmedabad, Mumbai, Chennai, Kolkata, and Lucknow will also conduct criminal investigations for the DCI. The ITD's intelligence wing oversees the Central Information Branch (CIB), which has a repository of data on taxpayers' financial transactions.

Directorate of Revenue Intelligence
The Directorate of Revenue Intelligence (DRI) is an intelligence-based organization responsible for the coordination of India's anti-smuggling efforts. Officers are drawn from the Indian Revenue Service and Group B of the Central Board of Indirect Taxes and Customs.

Central Economic Intelligence Bureau

The Central Economic Intelligence Bureau (CEIB) is the intelligence agency responsible for gathering information and monitoring the economic and financial sectors for economic offenses and warfare.

Directorate General of Central Excise Intelligence
The Directorate General of Central Excise Intelligence (DGCEI), formerly known as the Directorate General of Anti-Evasion, is an intelligence-based organization responsible for tax-evasion cases related to central excise duty and service tax. Officers are drawn from the Indian Revenue Service and Group B of the Central Board of Excise and Customs.

National Investigation Agency
The National Investigation Agency (NIA), the central agency combatting terrorism, can deal with interstate terror-related crimes without permission from the states. The National Investigation Agency Bill 2008, creating the agency, was moved in Parliament by the Home Minister on 16 December 2008. The NIA was created in response to the 2008 Mumbai attacks as a central counter-terrorism agency. Also dealing with drug trafficking and currency counterfeiting, it draws its officers from the IRS and the Indian Police Service.

Narcotics Control Bureau
The Narcotics Control Bureau is responsible for anti-narcotics operations nationwide, checking the spread of contraband and the cultivation of drugs. Officers in the bureau are drawn from the IPS and IRS.

Bureau of Police Research and Development
The Bureau of Police Research and Development (BPRD) was established on 28 August 1970 to modernize the police forces. It researches police issues, including training and the introduction of technology at the central and state levels.

National Crime Records Bureau
In 1979, the National Police Commission recommended the creation of agency to maintain criminal records and a database shareable at the federal and state levels. The National Crime Records Bureau (NCRB) was established by combining the Directorate of Coordination Police Computers, the Central Fingerprint Bureau, the Data Section of Coordination Division of the Central Bureau of Investigation, and the Statistical Section of the Bureau of Police Research and Development.

Central forensic institutions

Central Forensic Science Laboratory
The Central Forensic Science Laboratory (CFSL), a wing of the Ministry of Home Affairs, houses the only DNA repository in South and Southeast Asia. There are seven central forensic laboratories: in Hyderabad, Kolkata, Bhopal, Chandigarh, Pune, Guwahati and New Delhi. CFSL Hyderabad is a centre of excellence in chemical sciences, CFSL Kolkata in biological sciences, and CFSL Chandigarh in the physical sciences. The laboratories are primarily controlled by the ministry's Directorate of Forensic Science (DFS); the New Delhi lab is under the Central Bureau of Investigation, and investigates cases on its behalf.

National Institute of Criminology and Forensic Science
The National Institute of Criminology and Forensic Science (NICFS) was established on 4 January 1972 at the recommendation of a committee appointed by the University Grants Commission (UGC). In September 1979, the institute became a department of the Ministry of Home Affairs with a full-time director. It is headed by senior Indian Police Service officers. The institute trains in cybercrime investigations, and researches aspects of criminology and forensics (including cyberforensics). It is listed as a science and technology organization by the Department of Science and Technology.

State police

Authority over a state police force is held by the state's home department, led by a chief or principal secretary (generally an Indian Administrative Service officer). Each state and union territory has a state police force (headed by a Director General of Police, who is an IPS officer), which is responsible for maintaining law and order in the state's townships and rural areas.

The Police Act of 1861 established the principles of organization for police forces in India and, with minor modifications, continues in effect. Although state police forces are separate and may differ in quality of equipment and resources, their patterns of organization and operation are similar.

The director (or inspector general) of police reports to the head of the home department of the state, generally an Indian Administrative Service officer at the rank of additional chief secretary or principal secretary to the state government. Under the inspector general are police ranges composed of three to six districts, headed by deputy inspectors general. District police headquarters are commanded by superintendents of police (SP), who have discretionary powers and oversee subordinate police stations, criminal-investigation detachments, equipment storehouses and armories, and traffic police.

Most preventive police work is carried out by constables assigned to police stations. Depending on the number of stations, a district may be subdivided and further divided into police circles to facilitate supervision by district headquarters. Most major metropolitan areas, such as Mumbai, Kolkata and Chennai, have police commissionerates under the state police and headed by commissioners. Police in the states and union territories are assisted by units of volunteer Home Guards under guidelines formulated by the Ministry of Home Affairs.

In most states and territories, police forces are divided into civil (unarmed) police and armed contingents. Civil police staff police stations, conduct investigations, answer routine complaints, perform traffic duties, and patrol the streets. They usually carry lathis: bamboo staffs, weighted (or tipped) with iron.

Armed police are divided into two groups: district armed police and the Provincial Armed Constabulary. District armed police are organized like an army infantry battalion. Assigned to police stations, they perform guard and escort duties. States which maintain armed contingents use them as an emergency reserve strike force. The units are organized as a mobile armed force under state control or, in the case of district armed police (who are not as well equipped), as a force directed by district superintendents and generally used for riot control.

The Provincial Armed Constabulary is an armed reserve maintained at key locations in some states and activated on orders from the deputy inspector general and higher-level authorities. Armed constabulary are not usually in contact with the public unless they are assigned to VIP duty or maintaining order during fairs, festivals, athletic events, elections, and natural disasters. They may be sent to quell outbreaks of student or labour unrest, organized crime, and communal riots; to maintain key guard posts, and to participate in anti-terrorism operations. Depending on the assignment, the Provincial Armed Constabulary may only carry lathis.

Senior police officers answer to the police chain of command, and respond to the general direction of designated civilian officials. In the municipal force, the chain of command runs to the state home secretary rather than the district superintendent or district officials.

Recruits receive about  30,000 per month. Opportunities for promotion are limited because of the system of horizontal entry into higher grades. A 2016 article on the Maharashtra state police describes why reform is needed.

Women have entered into the higher echelons of Indian police in greater numbers since the late 1980s, primarily through the Indian Police Service system. Female officers were first used in 1972, and a number of women hold key positions in state police organizations. Their absolute numbers, however, are small. Uniformed and undercover women police officers have been deployed in New Delhi as the Anti-Eve Teasing Squad, which combats the sexual harassment of women ("Eves"). Several women-only police stations have been established in Tamil Nadu to handle sex crimes against women.

Uniforms

Uniforms of state and local police vary by grade, region, and type of duty. The main service uniform for state police is khaki. Some cities, such as Kolkata, have white uniforms. Headgear differs by rank and state; officers usually wear a peaked cap, and constables wear berets or sidecaps. Branches such as the Central Bureau of Investigation do not have a uniform; business dress (shirt, tie, blazer, etc.) is worn with a badge. Special-service armed police have tactical uniforms in accordance with their function, and traffic police generally wear a white uniform.

Organisation

The state police is headed by an IPS officer with the rank of director general of police (DGP), assisted by two (or more) additional directors general of police (ADGs). Other DG rank officers head autonomous bodies not controlled by the DGP, such as the police recruitment board, fire service and police training. State forces are organised into zones, which consist of two (or more) ranges. Important zones are headed by an additional director general of police, and other zones are headed by an inspector-general of police (IG). Ranges consist of several districts. Important ranges are headed by an IG, and other ranges are headed by a DIG.

Important districts are headed by a senior superintendent of police (SSP), and other districts are headed by a superintendent of police (SP). If an SSP is heading the district, they are assisted by two (or more) SPs. If an SP is heading the district, they are generally assisted by one or two) SPs. Each district is divided into sub-divisions or circles, under a deputy superintendent of police (DSP). Each sub-division consists of several police stations commanded by an inspector of police, who is assisted by sub-inspectors (SIs) and assistant sub-inspectors (ASIs). In rural areas, a sub-inspector is in charge of a police station; sub-inspectors (and higher) can file a charge sheet in court.

District SPs are not empowered as executive magistrates. The district magistrate (DM, an IAS officer) exercises these powers, which include promulgating Section 144 of the Code of Criminal Procedure (CrPC) and issuing arms licenses.

Other than the district police forces, there can be various other departments under the state police, such as Criminal Investigation Department (CID), Economic Offences Wing (EOW), Fire department, Telecom, VIP Security, Traffic police, Government Railway Police (GRP), Anti-Corruption Organization,  State Armed Police Forces, Anti Terrorism Squad (ATS), Special Task Force (STF), State Crime Records Bureau (SCRB), Forensic Science Laboratory (FSL) etc.

Government Railway Police
The Government Railway Police (GRP) is the police force that is responsible for policing on the railway stations and trains of Indian Railways. Its duties correspond to those of the District Police in the areas under their jurisdiction, but only on railway property. While Railway Protection Force (RPF) comes under Ministry of Railways, Government of India, GRP comes under the respective state police or UT police.

Police Commissionerates

Some major metropolitan cities use the police commissionerate system (like Delhi, Mumbai, Chennai, Kolkata, Bengaluru, Hyderabad, Ahmedabad, Lucknow, Jaipur etc.), headed by a police commissioner. Demand for this system is increasing as it gives police a free hand to act freely and take control of any situation. 68 large cities and suburban areas currently have this system in India.

Even in British Raj, the presidency towns of Calcutta, Bombay and Madras had commissionerate system.

Reporting to the Police Commissioner (CP) are the Joint Police Commissioner (Joint CPs), Deputy Commissioner of Police (DCPs) and Assistant Commissioner of Police (ACPs). Commissioners of police and their deputies are empowered as executive magistrates to enforce Section 144 of the CrPC and issue arms licenses.

Police commissionerates are subordinate to the state police except for the Kolkata Police, which independently reports to the Department of Home of Government of West Bengal.

Traffic police

Highway police and traffic police in small towns are under the state police; traffic police in cities are under the metropolitan and state police.

Traffic police maintain a smooth traffic flow and stop offenders.

Highway police secure the highways and catch speeders. Accidents, registrations, and vehicle data are checked by traffic police.

State Armed Police Forces
The State Armed Police Forces provide a state with policing in particularly violent or serious situations, such as combating banditry and Naxalites. Like the Central Armed Police Forces, they are known unofficially as paramilitary forces. Each state police force maintains an armed force, with names such as Provincial Armed Constabulary (PAC) and Special Armed Police, which is responsible for emergencies and crowd control. They are generally activated on orders from a deputy inspector general or higher-level authorities. List of the State Armed Police Forces are hereinbelow.

Role of women
In 1972, Kiran Bedi became the first female Indian Police Service officer. Twenty years later, Asha Sinha was the first female commandant of the paramilitary forces. Kanchan Chaudhary Bhattacharya was the first female director general of police in a state when she was appointed DGP of the Uttarakhand Police. In 2018, IPS Officer Archana Ramasundram became the first female paramilitary DGP (Sashastra Seema Bal).
 
Women had previously been limited to supervisory roles in the Central Armed Police Forces. The parliamentary Committee on Empowerment of Women recommended greater roles for women in the CAPF. In accordance with this recommendation, the Ministry of Home Affairs mandated preferential treatment for women in paramilitary constabularies and later declared that women could be combat officers in all five Central Armed Police Forces. The Union Home Minister announced that female representation in the CRPF and Central Industrial Security Force would be 15 percent and five percent in the Border Security Force, Indo-Tibetan Border Police and Sashastra Seema Bal. On 5 January 2016, it was decided that 33 percent of CRPF and CISF constabulary posts would be reserved for women in the CRPF and the CISF, and 14-15 percent in the BSF, SSB and ITBP.

Forest Service 

The maintenance of Forest and Forest land falls within the ambit of respective Forest services of state who is headed by Indian Forest Service (IFoS) Officer. The main mandate of the service is the implementation of the National Forest Policy in order to ensure the ecological stability of the country through the protection and participatory sustainable management of natural resources. An IFoS officer is wholly independent of the district administration and exercises administrative, judicial and financial powers in his own domain. Positions in state forest department, such as District/Divisional Forest Officer (DFO), Conservator of Forests (CF), Chief Conservator of Forests (CCF) and Principal Chief Conservator of Forests (PCCF) etc., are held only by IFoS officers. The highest ranking IFS official in each state is the Head of Forest Forces (HoFF). Apart from this Forest are regularly patrolled by Forest Rangers although they don't have arrest powers but they are task in detecting and stopping smugglers of Forest produce and poacher. Upon detection the accused/s are handed over to police for further process. The duties of the Forest Service are not confined to stopping of crimes but also have responsibility to develop tourism and also to look after villages falling under Forest land. Forest Services role came to forefront due to smuggling and poaching activities of Verrappan.

There are reports of forest guards being overwhelmed by the animals and poachers and smuggler due to lack of equipment or obsolete equipment.  Forest Guards have been reported not able to fight back since they have been under heavy restrictions of usage of weapons and even if available they are no match to automatic weapons employed by the poachers and smugglers.

Although due to nature of the duty Forest guards is a male dominated profession more and more women have been recruited in forest services. This women guards are performing duty akin to their male counterparts. The role of women in Forest service is highlighted in Discovery Channel India's four part documentary series "Lion Queens of India" based on forest guards of Gir wildlife sanctuary, Gujarat.

The Forest Department although greatly restricted in carrying firearm, These firearms are only for protection of self and accompanying forest personnels including temporary workers, and the conditions of use of firearms of all descriptions are very rigidly laid out and the use of every cartridge, even for training purposes, has to be immediately accounted for to the department as well as to the Executive Magistrate having jurisdiction and the police. In case of any human casualties arising out of use of these firearms the Executive Magistrate having jurisdiction conducts enquiry and only when he finds that the use of fire arms was unauthorised, illegal, or excessive, further action is taken by the police. Injuries or death of wild animals of all descriptions has to be reported to the Chief Wildlife Warden of the state without delay first over wireless and then in writing. The Forest guards are generally issued .303 Lee Enfield SMLE and 12 Bore double barrel shotgun or single barrel shotgun while under special circumstance L1A1 Self-Loading Rifle are also issued.

The Forest Department are usually travel in Mahindra Jeep or other off-road vehicle, the Forest Department also travel on motorcycles especially Royal Enfield Motorcycles and Hero Splendor.

The Forest guards have uniforms similar to that of police with women also being given option of Salwar kameez.

Selection and training

The recruitment process differs by position, and direct entry (where an applicant does not have to start at the lowest level) is possible. Educational requirements increase for higher posts.

Assistant superintendents of police (ASP) are recruited annually by the independent Union Public Service Commission by competitive examination, and are appointed to the Indian Police Service. The IPS officers are then assigned to a state force. Trainee officers undergo 44 weeks of initial training, which includes invited lawyers and management consultants. At the end of their probation, they have several weeks of orientation at the state police academy.

Non-managerial positions are selected by the state (or central) government, and are trained at police recruit schools. The length of training for inspectors is about a year; for constables, it is nearly nine months. School training staff is drawn from the police force. Police are trained in basic law, self-protection, weapons handling and other skills at recruit stations. Superior recruits receive special training.

Recruitment for state police is conducted by state police recruitment boards. Eligibility standards are set by the central government, depending on state demographics.

Transport

Unlike other countries, state police forces rely on SUVs. The Mahindra Legend Jeep had been the most common police car in India; other SUVs, such as the Maruti Gypsy, Mahindra Bolero, Tata Sumo, Tata Safari, Chevrolet Tavera and Toyota Qualis, are now used. SUVs are known for their capability in varied terrain.

Minivans are used by police in cities such as Delhi, Mumbai, Bangalore and Lucknow where the Chevrolet Tavera (Delhi, Kochi, Kozhikode and Thiruvananthapuram), Toyota Qualis (Mumbai, Delhi and Chennai) and Maruti Suzuki Ertiga (Bangalore, Lucknow and Pune) are extensively used. Although most cities use SUVs and minivans, Chennai has adopted sedans such as the Hyundai Accent; Kolkata has adopted the Tata Indigo. In Kerala cities such as Thiruvananthapuram, Kochi and Kozhikode, the Pink Patrol (to protect women) uses the Toyota Etios. Mumbai Police and Lucknow Police use Mahindra TUV for Pink Police.

Depending upon the state, police vehicles may have revolving lights, strobes, or light bars. A modernization drive has ensured that vehicles are equipped with two-way radios in communication with a central control room. Highway police vehicles generally have radar equipment, breath analyzers, and emergency first aid kits. For traffic regulation and city patrol, motorcycles are also used; most was the Indian version of the Royal Enfield Bullet, but the Bajaj Pulsar and TVS Apache are also used.

Weapons and equipment 
Weapons and equipment vary from state to state and agency to agency. Standard equipment for a constable on the beat is the lathi, or long baton—generally made of bamboo, but currently also made of polymer. Riot police have other equipment, including tear gas and tasers.

Although police constables do not generally carry firearms on regular duty, they are available at police stations. Officers at and above the rank of sub-inspector or head constable are authorized to carry a side arm, generally a Pistol Auto 9mm 1A or a Glock 17. Officers always carry side arms. Traffic police officers have fine books and other equipment.

Firearms previously stocked at police stations included .303 Lee–Enfield rifles (now replaced), 7.62 1A self-loading rifles and SAF Carbine 2A1s, which have been replaced by AK-47 and INSAS rifles. The Ordnance Factory Board is a supplier of arms, ammunition, uniforms, bullet-proof vehicles, and mine-protected vehicles to the police. Only a station officer can allow the use of reserve guns in emergencies. During public unrest, protests or possible terrorist attacks, police are equipped by the state (or central) government.

Special units at the state and federal level have automatic weapons, such as the AK-47, AKM and INSAS assault rifles and Bren guns. Special-forces and SWAT units use Heckler & Koch MP5s, Brügger & Thomet MP9s, AK-103s, M4A1 Carbines and others. Bulletproof jackets are generally not worn by state police, although special units carry tactical vests, gear, and weapons according to function.

Mukhbir

Informers (mukhbir) provide information for financial compensation. Police agencies budget for their mukhbirs because they are "the eyes and ears of police", and help resolve cases. In 2012, the Delhi Police budgeted  40 lakh ( 4 million) to pay their mukhbir ( 2,000 per inspector).

Public perception
In general, police in India lack public trust and are not viewed as legitimate authorities. People generally do not go to the police for help if given the choice, and often specifically take pains to avoid them. Oftentimes, when people do go to the police, it is "only for instrumental purposes, such as obtaining a First Information Report (FIR) as documentary evidence to be used to achieve some end". People expect the police be unhelpful at best, and  corrupt or brutal "little tyrants" at worst. Former Union Home Minister P. Chidambaram characterised the police constable as "the most reviled public servant in India." Even police officers themselves often lack faith in the institution, as illustrated by an apocryphal story popular among officers where "a self-styled 'honest cop'" asks a group of fellow officers if they would trust their coworkers to take care of a family member in trouble — to which none of them said yes.

Scholars usually tend to attribute the police's poor reputation in India to two main factors. First, the police as an institution in India was first developed by the British as an instrument of control. The 1861 Police Act, which remains "the institutional bedrock across the country", configured the police to focus less on public service and crime investigation, and more on "coercive order keeping and crowd pacification". Second, the police in postcolonial India are affected by the same corruption and abuse of power that has plagued the government in general. Police have historically been known to apply excessive force, extortion, and arbitrary and often discriminatory use of authority.

See also 
 Indian Armed Forces
 Judiciary of India
 Indian Penal Code
 Indian criminal law
 Government of India
 Mass surveillance in India
 List of Indian intelligence agencies
 National Counter Terrorism Centre
 Police Complaints Authority (India)
 Indian Police Foundation and Institute
 List of cases of police brutality in India
 Crime and Criminal Tracking Network and Systems
 List of countries and dependencies by number of police officers

References

External links